Gordon State College is a public college in Barnesville, Georgia.  A member of the University System of Georgia, Gordon State's spring 2021 enrollment was 2,890 students. The college campus incorporates , which includes academic buildings, residence halls, the student activity and recreation center, an indoor swimming facility, ropes course, walking trail, outdoor basketball courts, tennis courts, athletic fields, and racquetball courts.

History

The 19th century

Gordon State College was founded in 1852 as the Male and Female Seminary, a private school for higher education of boys and girls. Though church-sponsored, it was not a seminary in the usual sense. During the American Civil War, boys were organized into a corps of cadets. Girls continued to attend but were never included in military programs.

In 1872, the school was renamed Gordon Institute to honor Georgia native, governor and former CSA General John B. Gordon, and its scope was extended to the elementary grades. In 1890, J.C. Woodward, who later founded Georgia Military Academy, was hired to start a military program.

The 20th century

In 1907, the name changed to Gordon College. In 1916 the U.S. Department of War named Gordon College a junior military unit. In 1928, Gordon added the  first two years of college to its program. In 1933 the state offered the former Georgia Industrial College campus to Gordon College. The high school and junior college departments moved to the new campus, while the elementary school moved into the former high school building. Gordon College was known as Gordon Military College from the mid-1930s until 1972.

In the 1950s, ownership of the school passed to the city of Barnesville, which consolidated its government-funded public schools for whites in grades 8-12, while continuing to bus black students to racially segregated Lamar County schools. City girls were enrolled as regular students. City boys were permitted to opt out of military participation, but almost all were organized into a corps of cadets under military discipline. Military cadets from other places were permitted to enroll by paying tuition; attracted by low tuition rates, many cadets came from Latin America.

Gordon State experienced financial problems in the 1960s, and in 1970 the trustees approached the state about making the college part of the university system. The secondary school was separated and the cadet corps disbanded, and on July 2, 1972, Gordon Military College officially became part of the University System of Georgia as Gordon Junior College, an associate-level college. In 1986 "junior" was dropped from the school's name.

The 21st century

In 2006, the school was designated a four-year state college and now offers 10 bachelor's degree programs.

On August 8, 2012, the Board of Regents approved the change of the name of Gordon College to Gordon State College. The action follows the board's approval in 2006 of a change in status for the two-year college in Barnesville to allow it to offer baccalaureate programs within the University System's state college sector.

Academics
Gordon State College offers bachelor's degrees and Associate of Arts degrees as well as an Associate of Science degree and Bachelor of Science degree in nursing.

Athletics
Gordon State College competes in Region XVII of the Georgia College Athletic Association and the National Junior College Athletic Association. The college has teams in women's soccer and softball, men's baseball and basketball.

There are also a variety of intramural sports.

Before the 1980s, the athletic teams at Gordon State were the Bulldogs. Through the mid-1980s, Gordon State's teams were known as the Generals, a nod to General Gordon. The teams are now called the Highlanders.

Notable alumni
Rufus C. Harris, Tulane president
William D. Pawley, United States ambassador to Peru and Brazil; businessman
Richard B. Russell Jr., governor of Georgia

References

External links
 Official website
 Gordon State College in the New Georgia Encyclopedia

 
Educational institutions established in 1852
Education in Lamar County, Georgia
Buildings and structures in Lamar County, Georgia
Universities and colleges accredited by the Southern Association of Colleges and Schools
NJCAA athletics
1852 establishments in Georgia (U.S. state)
Public universities and colleges in Georgia (U.S. state)